Dundalk entered the 2016 season as the reigning League Champions and FAI Cup holders from 2014, having won the 'Double' for the first time since 1987–88. 2016 was Stephen Kenny's third season at the club as manager. It was Dundalk's seventh consecutive season in the top tier of Irish football, their 80th in all, and their 89th in the League of Ireland.

Season summary
After dominating domestically throughout the season, a third league title in a row was sealed with two games to spare in 2016, A chance at a 'Double Double' was spurned, however, when they lost in the FAI Cup Final to a goal scored in the last minute of extra time by Cork City F.C.

The 2016–17 Champions League saw the club qualify for the Champions League play-off round, after they first defeated FH of Iceland, then came from a goal down in the tie to defeat BATE 3–0 in Tallaght Stadium, winning through 3–1 on aggregate. Dundalk drew Legia Warsaw, with the first leg played in the Aviva Stadium in Dublin in front of a crowd of 30,417. They suffered a 2–0 defeat in the home leg, but shocked Legia in the return leg by taking a 1–0 lead through Robbie Benson's volley. With Dundalk pushing for the equaliser that would have taken the tie to extra-time, Legia scored on the break, and won the tie 3–1 on aggregate.

Defeat in the play-off round meant that the club qualified for the group stage of the Europa League, only the second Irish team to have done so. A draw with AZ Alkmaar in the Netherlands, followed by a victory over Maccabi Tel Aviv in Tallaght Stadium, were the first points earned by an Irish club at this stage of a European competition – both the equaliser in Alkmaar and the winning goal in Tallaght being scored by Ciarán Kilduff. In the third match they took the lead in Tallaght against Zenit St Petersburg, and were 20 minutes from topping the table, before eventually losing 2–1. In a campaign that would run from 13 July to 8 December, five weeks beyond the end of the domestic season, Dundalk failed to pick up any more points in the remaining matches. But they had attracted considerable attention.

Squad

Non-competitive

Preseason friendlies

Competitive

League of Ireland

FAI Cup

League of Ireland Cup

Leinster Senior Cup

President's Cup

UEFA Champions League

Second qualifying round

Third qualifying round

Play-off round

UEFA Europa League

Group stage

Statistics

Appearances and goals 

|-
|}

References 

2016
2016 League of Ireland Premier Division by club
2016–17 UEFA Europa League participants seasons